Michel Fleury (17 November 1923 in Paris – 18 January 2002 in Paris) was a French historian, archivist and archaeologist, specialising in the history and archaeology of Paris. He is buried in the cemetery of the church of Saint-Germain de Loisé in Mortagne-au-Perche.

Sources
http://cths.fr/an/prosopo.php?id=100340

Archaeologists from Paris
1923 births
2002 deaths
French archivists
History of Paris
20th-century archaeologists
20th-century French historians